Tent pole can be
 a pole for a tent
 Tent-pole (entertainment), a production expected to hold up and balance out the financial performance